Trigonogenium is a genus of beetles in the family Buprestidae, the jewel beetles. Species are native to Chile and Argentina.

Species include:

 Trigonogenium angulosum (Solier, 1849)
 Trigonogenium biforme Cobos, 1986
 Trigonogenium subaequale (Fairmaire & Germain, 1864)

References

Buprestidae genera
Beetles of South America